Al-Atlal (Arabic: الأطلال, "The Ruins") is a poem written by the Egyptian poet Ibrahim Nagi, which later became a famous song sung by Egyptian singer Umm Kulthum in 1966. The songs text was adapted by Umm Kulthum and its melody composed by the Egyptian composer Riad Al Sunbati two years after her first song composed by Mohamed Abdel Wahab, “Inta Omri” (إنت عمري, "You are My Life"). Both of them were a huge success.

The poem
The song mixes between two poems from the same poet Ibrahim Nagi, meaning that the lyrics of the song are not exactly the words of the poem. The second poem is named "Al-Wadaa" (الوداع). Beside that, the song was recorded 13 years after the poet's death. It has been first published in 1944 within a compilation known as the Layali al-Qahira (Cairo Nights) and is inspired by the qasida, a pre-Islamic Arabic form of poetry.

The melody 
The melody was composed by Riad al-Sunbati in the 1960s. Sunbati is one of the most prominent composers in modern Arab music in general and regarding to Umm Kulthum in specific.

Reception
The songs became popular in the late 1960s when Umm Kulthum began to sing it, and since the Six Day War between Israel and several Arab countries, several prominent critics considered the song as the Arab Song  par excellence.

References

See also
Umm Kulthum
Riad Al Sunbati
Ibrahim Nagi

Arabic poems
Egyptian songs
Umm Kulthum songs